Konstantin Fyodorovich Olshansky (21 May 1915 – 27 March 1944) was a Senior Lieutenant and Soviet marine of the Black Sea Fleet, born in Prykolotne, Ukraine. He died during an assault on the port of Mykolaiv, Ukraine, formerly Nikolaev, occupied in World War II by German forces, and was posthumously awarded Hero of the Soviet Union.

Legacy
Among other commemorations, the landing ship U402 Костянтин Ольшанський (Ukrainian Navy), formerly BDK-56 (Soviet Navy), the settlement of Olshanske in Mykolaiv Oblast, Ukraine, and the minor planet 2310 Olshaniya were named after him.

References

Further reading
(all in Russian)
 Герои Советского Союза Военно-Морского Флота 1937-45 ("Heroes of the Soviet Union in the Black Sea Fleet 1937-45"). Moscow: Voyenizdat, 1977
 Герои Советского Союза. Краткий биографический словарь("Heroes of the Soviet Union. Short Biographical Dictionary"), vol 2. Moscow: Voyenizdat, 1988
 Arkhipenko, V K: Созвездие ольшанцев ("Constellation of Olshany")(2nd edn.). Moscow 1980
 Beshanov, V: Десять Сталинских Ударов ("Ten Stalinist Strikes"). Minsk 2003
 Bodrov, M P: Подвиг отряда(Feat of the Squads"). Moscow 1968
 Dotsenko, V D: Морской Биографический Словарь ("Marine Biographical Dictionary"). St Petersburg, 1995
 Dotsenko, V D: Словарь Биографический Морской ("Marine Biographical Dictionary"). St Petersburg, 2000
 Medvedev, N Y: Нас было 68 ("There Were 68 of Us"). Moscow, 1966
 Zhigalov, I M: Флотская доблесть ("Naval Prowess"). Moscow, 1983 
 Зарево над Бугом ("Glow Over the [River] Bug"). Odessa, 1974
 Освобождение городов: Справочник по освобождению городов в период ВОВ 1941—1945 ("Liberation of Cities: Guide to the liberation of cities during the Second World War 1941-1945")

1915 births
1944 deaths
Soviet military personnel of World War II from Ukraine
Soviet military personnel killed in World War II
Heroes of the Soviet Union
People from Kharkiv Oblast